WABI or wabi may refer to:

 Wabi (software), a product from Sun Microsystems that implements the Microsoft Windows API specifications
 Wabi people, another name for the Huave people of Oaxaca
 WABI-TV, a television station licensed to Bangor, Maine, United States
 WTOS (AM), a radio station licensed to Bangor, Maine, United States, which held the call sign WABI from 1924 to 2009
 WBFB, a radio station licensed to Bangor, Maine, United States, which held the call sign WABI-FM from 1961 to 1973
 Wabi, a component of the Wabi-sabi Japanese aesthetic
 WABI conference - The Workshop on Algorithms in Bioinformatics, a yearly computer science conference since 2001